Lucrezia de' Medici (14 February 1545 – 21 April 1561) was a member of the House of Medici and by marriage Duchess consort of Ferrara, Modena and Reggio from 1558–1561.

Married to the intended husband of her elder sister Maria, who died young, her marriage was short and unhappy. The Duchess died of pulmonary tuberculosis, but almost immediately after her death there were rumors that she had been poisoned on the orders of her husband. That suspicion inspired the English poet Robert Browning to create a dramatic monologue in verse "My Last Duchess" (1842).

Life

Early years
Born in Florence on 14 February 1545, Lucrezia was the fifth child and third daughter of Cosimo I de' Medici, Duke of Florence (and since 1569 Grand Duke of Tuscany), and Eleanor of Toledo. Her paternal grandparents were the famous Condottiere Giovanni delle Bande Nere and Maria Salviati (granddaughter of Lorenzo the Magnificent). Her maternal grandparents were Pedro Álvarez de Toledo, Viceroy of Naples, and Maria Osorio, 2nd Marchioness of Villafranca del Bierzo. Lucrezia was named after her great-grandmother Lucrezia de' Medici (1470–1553) (mother of Maria Salviati).

Like all children of the Medici Ducal couple, Lucrezia received a good education and was brought up in strict accordance with Spanish court ceremonial, which her mother followed. The girls in this family could not leave their chambers without permission, and there only a duenna was permitted to be with them. In addition to their father and brothers, only elderly confessors were admitted to them privately.

Marriage
From childhood, her parents were seeking suitable marriage candidates for their daughters. In the period 1549–1550, it was planned to marry Lucrezia to Don Pedro de Aragona y Cardona, 3rd Duke of Montalto. And in 1552 she was betrothed to Fabio Dal Monte, nephew of Pope Julius III, but the engagement was canceled after the death of the Pope in 1555. 

In 1557, as a sign of reconciliation between Ercole II d'Este, Duke of Ferrara (who held a pro-French position), and King Philip II of Spain, it was decided that Alfonso d'Este, Hereditary Prince of Ferrara, would marry Maria de' Medici, the eldest daughter of Cosimo I, an ally of Spain. However, Maria died shortly thereafter and Lucrezia took her place.

The marriage between a prince from the House of Este and a princess from the House of Medici was opposed by a pro-French party at the groom's court. Margaret and Elisabeth, sister and daughter, respectively of King Henry II of France, were suggested instead to the Ferrarese court as wives for the hereditary Prince. And the ambassadors who arrived in Florence from Ferrara, who had not yet seen Lucrezia, had heard rumors, deliberately spread around the Ferrara court, as to her plain appearance and poor health. 

Nevertheless, on 13 April 1558 a marriage contract was signed in Pisa, according to which a dowry of 200,000 gold scudi was given for the bride. On 11 May Alessandro Fiaschi, the chief representative of Ferrara, presented a ring to Lucrezia as a sign of the betrothal. The ambassadors saw her then for the first time and were pleased with the appearance of the princess. She seemed to them a well-mannered and virtuous girl.

Alfonso d'Este solemnly entered Florence on 18 May 1558. On 3 July, 24-year-old Alfonso and 13-year-old Lucrezia were married in the chapel in the Palazzo Pitti (or according to another version in the Basilica of Santa Maria Novella), by the bishop of Cortona, Giovan Battista di Simone Ricasoli. At the request of his mother-in-law, the hereditary Prince of Ferrara agreed to postpone the wedding night until such time as his bride reached her sexual maturity. 

According to an oral agreement between him and his father-in-law, which they reached at the conclusion of the marriage contract three days after the wedding, Alfonso left Florence. He went to the French court in Paris, who promised to pay off a sovereign debt to the Duchy of Ferrara of 300,000 ducats. Lucrezia, despite the invitation of her father-in-law to move to Ferrara, remained in Florence at the request of her mother, to wait for her husband to come for her.

Together with her sister Isabella, the new hereditary Princess of Ferrara continued to live in the chambers of the Palazzo Pitti, isolated from the rest of the world. Lucrezia had fallen in love with her husband; however, he was indifferent to her. Her numerous letters to him often went unanswered. While waiting for Alfonso to come to her, she ate almost nothing and spoke little, and every day she prayed for him for a long time at the morning service. The hereditary Princess desperately wanted to leave her strict maternal care and start an independent life. 

After some time, Duke Cosimo I expressed dissatisfaction to his son-in-law at the manner in which he was delaying his return to collect his wife. Only after the death of Duke Ercole II on 3 October 1559, when Alfonso became Duke of Ferrara, Modena and Reggio under the name of Alfonso II, and his spouse became, accordingly, Duchess consort, did he leave France and come to take her away with him. On 17 February 1560, Lucrezia solemnly entered Ferrara.

Circumstances of death
Once in Ferrara, the already frail Duchess spent almost all her time in her rooms. Less than a year after her arrival, on 21 April 1561, she died, after suffering a month of fever, severe weight loss, constant coughing and a permanently bleeding nose. According to Dr. Andrea Pascvali, sent to the Duchess by her father from Florence, during the entire period of Lucrezia's illness, her husband continued to be concerned at her state of health. An autopsy by the same doctor revealed that the Duchess had died of "putrid fever"; modern historians believe that her death was caused by pulmonary tuberculosis. Despite this, after her death, there were rumors that she had been poisoned.

Lucrezia was buried in the Corpus Domini Monastery, the ancestral mausoleum of the House of Este in Ferrara. Her marriage to Alfonso II was childless, and the widowed Duke married twice more: in 1565 to the Archduchess Barbara of Austria and in 1579 to Margherita Gonzaga. In both marriages he had no children. With the death of Alfonso II, the Duchy of Ferrara became part of the Papal States, and the Duchies of Modena and Reggio passed to his nephew Cesare d'Este, a descendant of the d'Este family through an illegitimate line.

In culture
A portrait of Lucrezia has survived, now kept in the North Carolina Museum of Art in the city of Raleigh, North Carolina. According to some experts, it was the work of Bronzino; according to others, was painted by Bronzino's nephew Alessandro Allori. A copy of this painting is kept in the Palazzo Pitti. Other portraits of Lucrezia are in the collections of the Uffizi Gallery and the Ambras Castle; the half-length image in the Uffizi has been attributed to Alessandro Allori.

There are several medals depicting the Duchess of Ferrara: three works by Pastorino dei Pastorini and one by Domenico Poggini. All of them were made to commemorate the wedding of Lucrezia and Alfonso II.

Shocked at the death of the young Duchess, Bronzino dedicated a posthumous sonnet to her. Lucrezia is also the heroine of the dramatic monologue in verse "My Last Duchess" by Robert Browning, first published under the title "Italy" in 1842, and under the more well-known title in 1845. She is also the subject of the 2022 novel The Marriage Portrait by award-winning author Maggie O'Farrell. Inspired by Browning's poem, her marriage to Alfonso is the subject of Gabrielle Kimm's 2010 novel His Last Duchess.

Ancestry

Notes

References

Bibliography

 
 

|-

|-

1545 births
1561 deaths
Nobility from Florence
Lucrezia
16th-century Italian nobility
Hereditary Princesses of Modena
Lucrezia di Cosimo de' Medici
Lucrezia
Lucrezia
Lucrezia
Lucrezia
House of Este
16th-century deaths from tuberculosis
Burials at the Corpus Domini Monastery, Ferrara
16th-century Italian women
Tuberculosis deaths in Italy
Infectious disease deaths in Emilia-Romagna
Daughters of monarchs